Steven Aimable (born 7 February 1999 in Cayenne) is a Senegalese swimmer. In 2019, he represented Senegal at the 2019 World Aquatics Championships held in Gwangju, South Korea. In the men's 50 metre backstroke he finished in 46th place in the heats.

In the same year, he also represented Senegal at the 2019 African Games held in Rabat, Morocco. His best result came in the men's 100 metre butterfly event where he finished in 7th place in the final. In the men's 50 metre freestyle, men's 100 metre freestyle, men's 50 metre backstroke and men's 50 metre butterfly events he did not qualify to compete in the final.

In 2021, he competed in the men's 100 metre butterfly event at the 2020 Summer Olympics held in Tokyo, Japan.

References

External links 
 

Living people
1999 births
Senegalese male swimmers
Male backstroke swimmers
Male butterfly swimmers
Senegalese male freestyle swimmers
Swimmers at the 2019 African Games
African Games competitors for Senegal
Swimmers at the 2020 Summer Olympics
21st-century Senegalese people
Sportspeople from Cayenne